This is a list of Nobel Prize laureates by country. Listings for Economics refer to the related Nobel Memorial Prize in Economic Sciences. The Nobel Prizes and the Prize in Economic Sciences have been awarded 567 times to 889 recipients, of which 26 awards (all Peace Prizes) were to organizations. Due to some recipients receiving multiple awards, the total number of recipients is 860 individuals and 22 organizations.

The present list ranks laureates under the country/countries that are stated by the Nobel Prize committee on its website. The list does not distinguish between laureates who received a full prize and the majority who shared a prize. Some laureates are listed under more than one country, because the official website mentions multiple countries in relation to the laureate. If a country is merely mentioned as the place of birth, an asterisk (*) is used in the respective listing to indicate this. In this case, the birth country is mentioned in italics at the other listings of this laureate.

Organizations are listed here if the Nobel Prize committee relates them to a single country.

Summary

Nobel Prizes by category/country of birth

Algeria 

 Claude Cohen-Tannoudji*, Physics, 1997

Argentina

César Milstein*, Physiology or Medicine, 1984
Adolfo Pérez Esquivel, Peace, 1980
Luis Federico Leloir, born in France, Chemistry, 1970
Bernardo Houssay, Physiology or Medicine, 1947
Carlos Saavedra Lamas, Peace, 1936

Armenia 

 Ardem Patapoutian, born in Lebanon, Physiology or Medicine, 2021

Australia

Brian Schmidt, born in the United States, Physics, 2011
Elizabeth Blackburn*, Physiology or Medicine, 2009
Barry Marshall, Physiology or Medicine, 2005
J. Robin Warren, Physiology or Medicine, 2005
Peter C. Doherty, Physiology or Medicine, 1996
Rolf Zinkernagel, Physiology or Medicine, 1996
John Cornforth*, Chemistry, 1975
Patrick White, born in the United Kingdom, Literature, 1973
Aleksandr M. Prokhorov, Physics, 1964
John Carew Eccles, Physiology or Medicine, 1963
Sir Frank Macfarlane Burnet, Physiology or Medicine, 1960
Howard Florey, Physiology or Medicine, 1945
William Lawrence Bragg, Physics, 1915
William Henry Bragg, Physics, 1915

Austria
Anton Zeilinger, Physics, 2022
Peter Handke, Literature, 2019
Martin Karplus*, Chemistry, 2013
Elfriede Jelinek, Literature, 2004
Eric Kandel*, Physiology or Medicine, 2000
Walter Kohn*, Chemistry, 1998
Friedrich Hayek, Economics, 1974
Konrad Lorenz, Physiology or Medicine, 1973
Karl von Frisch*, Physiology or Medicine, 1973
Max Perutz, Chemistry, 1962
Wolfgang Pauli, Physics, 1945
Richard Kuhn*, Chemistry, 1938
Otto Loewi, born in Germany, Physiology or Medicine, 1936
Victor Francis Hess, Physics, 1936
Erwin Schrödinger, Physics, 1933
Karl Landsteiner, Physiology or Medicine, 1930
Julius Wagner-Jauregg, Physiology or Medicine, 1927
Richard Adolf Zsigmondy, Chemistry, 1925
Fritz Pregl, born in Austria-Hungary, now Slovenia, Chemistry, 1923
Róbert Bárány, Physiology or Medicine, 1914
Alfred Hermann Fried, Peace, 1911
Bertha von Suttner, born in the Austrian Empire, now Czech Republic, Peace, 1905

Austro-Hungary

Born in Austrian part of Austro-Hungarian Empire
Friedrich Hayek, Economics, 1974
Konrad Lorenz, Physiology or Medicine, 1973
Karl von Frisch*, Physiology or Medicine, 1973
Max Perutz, Chemistry, 1962
Wolfgang Pauli, Physics, 1945
Richard Kuhn*, Chemistry, 1938
Otto Loewi, born in Germany, Physiology or Medicine, 1936
Victor Francis Hess, Physics, 1936
Erwin Schrödinger, Physics, 1933
Karl Landsteiner, Physiology or Medicine, 1930
Julius Wagner-Jauregg, Physiology or Medicine, 1927
Richard Adolf Zsigmondy, Chemistry, 1925
Fritz Pregl, born in Austria-Hungary, now Slovenia, Chemistry, 1923
Róbert Bárány, Physiology or Medicine, 1914
Alfred Hermann Fried, Peace, 1911
Bertha von Suttner, born in the Austrian Empire, now Czech Republic, Peace, 1905

Born in Hungarian part of Austro-Hungarian Empire

Dennis Gabor, Physics, 1971
Eugene Wigner, Physics, 1963
Georg von Békésy, Physiology or Medicine, 1961
George de Hevesy, Chemistry, 1943
Albert Szent-Györgyi, Physiology or Medicine, 1937
Richard Adolf Zsigmondy, Chemistry, 1925
Róbert Bárány, born in Austria, Medicine, 1914
Philipp Lenard, Physics, 1905

Croatia in Hungary
Leopold Ružička*, Ethnic Czech and Croatian national born in the Kingdom of Croatia-Slavonia part of Kingdom of Hungary in Austro-Hungarian Empire (now Croatia), Chemistry, 1939

Other countries 
Vladimir Prelog*, Ethnic Croat and national born in Condominium of Bosnia and Herzegovina, Austro-Hungarian Empire (now Bosnia and Herzegovina), Chemistry, 1975

Bangladesh
Muhammad Yunus, Peace, 2006

Belarus
Ales Bialiatski, Peace, 2022
Svetlana Alexievich, born in Ukraine, Literature, 2015
Zhores Alferov*, Physics, 2000

Belgium

François Englert, Physics, 2013
Ilya Prigogine, born in Russia, Chemistry, 1977
Christian de Duve, born in the United Kingdom, Physiology or Medicine, 1974
Albert Claude, Physiology or Medicine, 1974
Dominique Pire, Peace, 1958
Corneille Heymans, Physiology or Medicine, 1938
Jules Bordet, Physiology or Medicine, 1919
Henri La Fontaine, Peace, 1913
Maurice Maeterlinck, Literature, 1911
Auguste Beernaert, Peace, 1909
Institut de Droit International, Peace, 1904

Bosnia and Herzegovina
Ivo Andrić*, Ethnic Serb and Yugoslav national born in Condominium of Bosnia and Herzegovina, Austria-Hungary (now Bosnia and Herzegovina), Literature,  1961	
Vladimir Prelog*,  born in Condominium of Bosnia and Herzegovina, Austria-Hungary (now Bosnia and Herzegovina), Chemistry, 1975

Bulgaria
Elias Canetti*, Literature, 1981

Canada
David Card, Economics, 2021
Jim Peebles, Physics, 2019
Donna Strickland, Physics, 2018
Arthur B. McDonald, Physics, 2015
Alice Munro, Literature, 2013
Ralph M. Steinman, Physiology or Medicine, 2011
Willard S. Boyle*, Physics, 2009
Jack W. Szostak, born in the United Kingdom, Physiology or Medicine, 2009
Robert Mundell, Economics, 1999
Myron Scholes*, Economics, 1997
William Vickrey*, Economics, 1996
Pugwash Conferences on Science and World Affairs, Peace, 1995
Bertram Brockhouse, Physics, 1994
Michael Smith, born in the United Kingdom, Chemistry, 1993
Rudolph A. Marcus*, Chemistry, 1992
Richard E. Taylor, Physics, 1990
Sidney Altman*, Chemistry, 1989
John Polanyi, born in Germany, Chemistry, 1986
Henry Taube*, Chemistry, 1983
David H. Hubel*, Physiology or Medicine, 1981
Saul Bellow*, Literature, 1976
Gerhard Herzberg, born in Germany, Chemistry, 1971
Charles B. Huggins*, Physiology or Medicine, 1966
Lester B. Pearson, Peace, 1957
William Giauque*, Chemistry, 1949
Frederick G. Banting, Physiology or Medicine, 1923
John James Rickard Macleod, born in the United Kingdom of Great Britain and Ireland, Physiology or Medicine, 1923

Chile
Pablo Neruda, Literature, 1971
Gabriela Mistral, Literature, 1945

China (People's Republic of China)

Tu Youyou, Physiology or Medicine, 2015
Mo Yan, Literature, 2012
Liu Xiaobo, Peace, 2010
Charles K. Kao*, Physics, 2009
Gao Xingjian*, Literature, 2000
Daniel C. Tsui*, Physics, 1998
Samuel C. C. Ting*, Physics 1976
Chen-Ning Yang*, Physics, 1957
Tsung-Dao Lee*, Physics, 1957

Colombia
Juan Manuel Santos Calderón, Peace, 2016
Gabriel García Márquez, Literature, 1982

Congo, Democratic Republic
Denis Mukwege, Peace, 2018

Costa Rica
Óscar Arias Sánchez, Peace, 1987

Croatia
Leopold Ružička*, Ethnic Croat and national born in the Kingdom of Croatia-Slavonia part of Kingdom of Hungary in Austro-Hungarian Empire (now Croatia), Chemistry, 1939
Vladimir Prelog*, Ethnic Croat and national born in Condominium of Bosnia and Herzegovina, Austro-Hungarian Empire (now Bosnia and Herzegovina), Chemistry, 1975

Cyprus
Christopher A. Pissarides*, Economics, 2010

Czech Republic
Peter Grünberg*, born in the Protectorate of Bohemia and Moravia, (now Czech Republic), Physics, 2007
Jaroslav Seifert, born in Prague, Austria-Hungary, (now Czech Republic), Literature, 1984
Jaroslav Heyrovský, born in Prague, Austria-Hungary, (now Czech Republic), Chemistry, 1959
Carl Ferdinand Cori*, born in Prague, Austria-Hungary, (now Czech Republic), Physiology or Medicine, 1947 
Gerty Cori*, born in Prague, Austria-Hungary, (now Czech Republic), Physiology or Medicine, 1947
Bertha von Suttner*, born in Prague, Austria-Hungary, (now Czech Republic), Peace, 1905

Denmark

Morten P. Meldal, Chemistry, 2022
Jens Christian Skou, Chemistry, 1997
Niels Kaj Jerne, born in United Kingdom, Physiology or Medicine, 1984
Aage Bohr, Physics, 1975
Ben Roy Mottelson,  born in United States, Physics, 1975
Johannes V. Jensen, Literature, 1944
Henrik Dam, Physiology or Medicine, 1943
Johannes Fibiger, Physiology or Medicine, 1926
Niels Bohr, Physics, 1922
August Krogh, Physiology or Medicine, 1920
Karl Adolph Gjellerup, Literature, 1917
Henrik Pontoppidan, Literature, 1917
Fredrik Bajer, Peace, 1908
Niels Ryberg Finsen, born in Faroe Islands, Physiology or Medicine, 1903

East Timor
Carlos Filipe Ximenes Belo, Peace, 1996
José Ramos-Horta, Peace, 1996

Egypt

Mohamed ElBaradei, Peace, 2005
Ahmed Zewail, Chemistry, 1999
Naguib Mahfouz, Literature, 1988
Anwar Sadat, Peace, 1978

Ethiopia
Abiy Ahmed Ali, Peace, 2019

Faroe Islands
Niels Ryberg Finsen*, Physiology or Medicine, 1903

Finland
Bengt R. Holmström, Economics, 2016
Martti Ahtisaari, Peace, 2008
Ragnar Granit, born in the Grand Duchy of Finland, a part of the Russian Empire in 1809–1917, Physiology or Medicine, 1967
Artturi Ilmari Virtanen, born in the Grand Duchy of Finland, a part of the Russian Empire in 1809–1917, Chemistry, 1945
Frans Eemil Sillanpää, born in the Grand Duchy of Finland, a part of the Russian Empire in 1809–1917, Literature, 1939

France
Annie Ernaux, Literature, 2022
Alain Aspect, Physics, 2022
Emmanuelle Charpentier, Chemistry, 2020
Esther Duflo, Economics, 2019
Gérard Mourou, Physics, 2018
Jean-Pierre Sauvage, Chemistry, 2016
Jean Tirole, Economics, 2014
Patrick Modiano, Literature, 2014
Serge Haroche, born in Morocco, then under French protectorate, Physics, 2012
Jules A. Hoffmann, born in Luxembourg, Physiology or Medicine, 2011
J. M. G. Le Clézio, Literature, 2008
Luc Montagnier, Physiology or Medicine, 2008
Françoise Barré-Sinoussi, Physiology or Medicine, 2008
Albert Fert, Physics, 2007
Yves Chauvin, Chemistry, 2005
Gao Xingjian, born in China, Literature, 2000
Médecins Sans Frontières, Peace, 1999
Claude Cohen-Tannoudji, born in French Algeria, Physics, 1997
Georges Charpak, born in then Poland (Second Polish Republic), now Ukraine, Physics, 1992
Pierre-Gilles de Gennes, Physics, 1991
Maurice Allais, Economics, 1988
Jean-Marie Lehn, Chemistry, 1987
Claude Simon, Literature, 1985
Gérard Debreu, Economics, 1983
Jean Dausset, Physiology or Medicine, 1980
Roger Guillemin*, Physiology or Medicine, 1977
Seán MacBride*, Peace, 1974
Louis Néel, Physics, 1970
Luis Federico Leloir*, Chemistry, 1970
René Cassin, Peace, 1968
Alfred Kastler, Physics, 1966
François Jacob, Physiology or Medicine, 1965
Jacques Monod, Physiology or Medicine, 1965
André Lwoff, Physiology or Medicine, 1965
Jean-Paul Sartre, Literature, 1964 (declined the prize)
Saint-John Perse, Literature, 1960
Albert Camus, born in French Algeria, Literature, 1957
André Frédéric Cournand, Physiology or Medicine, 1956
François Mauriac, Literature, 1952
Albert Schweitzer, born in Alsace, then in Germany, Peace, 1952
Léon Jouhaux, Peace, 1951
André Gide, Literature, 1947
Roger Martin du Gard, Literature, 1937
Frédéric Joliot-Curie, Chemistry, 1935
Irène Joliot-Curie, Chemistry, 1935
Ivan Bunin, born in Russia, Literature, 1933
Louis de Broglie, Physics, 1929
Charles Nicolle, Physiology or Medicine, 1928
Henri Bergson, Literature, 1927
Ferdinand Buisson, Peace, 1927
Aristide Briand, Peace, 1926
Jean Baptiste Perrin, Physics, 1926
Anatole France, Literature, 1921
Léon Bourgeois, Peace, 1920
Romain Rolland, Literature, 1915
Alfred Werner*, Chemistry, 1913
Charles Richet, Physiology or Medicine, 1913
Alexis Carrel, Physiology or Medicine, 1912
Paul Sabatier, Chemistry, 1912
Victor Grignard, Chemistry, 1912
Marie Curie, born in Congress Poland (Russian Empire), Chemistry, 1911
Paul-Henri-Benjamin d'Estournelles de Constant, Peace, 1909
Gabriel Lippmann, born in Luxembourg, Physics, 1908
Charles Louis Alphonse Laveran, Physiology or Medicine, 1907
Louis Renault, Peace, 1907
Henri Moissan, Chemistry, 1906
Frédéric Mistral, Literature, 1904
Antoine Henri Becquerel, Physics, 1903
Pierre Curie, Physics, 1903
Marie Curie, born in Congress Poland, (Russian Empire), Physics, 1903
Henry Dunant, born in the Swiss Confederation, Peace, 1901
Frédéric Passy, Peace, 1901
Sully Prudhomme, Literature, 1901

Germany
Svante Pääbo, born in Sweden, Physiology or Medicine, 2022
Benjamin List, Chemistry, 2021
Klaus Hasselmann, Physics, 2021
Emmanuelle Charpentier*, Chemistry, 2020
Reinhard Genzel, Physics, 2020
John B. Goodenough*, Chemistry, 2019
Joachim Frank*, Chemistry, 2017
Rainer Weiss*, Physics, 2017
Stefan Hell, born in Romania, Chemistry, 2014
Thomas C. Südhof, Physiology or Medicine, 2013
Herta Müller, born in Romania, Literature, 2009
Harald zur Hausen, Physiology or Medicine, 2008
Gerhard Ertl, Chemistry, 2007
Peter Grünberg, born in the Protectorate of Bohemia and Moravia, now the Czech Republic, Physics, 2007
Theodor W. Hänsch, Physics, 2005
Wolfgang Ketterle, Physics, 2001
Herbert Kroemer, Physics, 2000
Günter Blobel*, Physiology or Medicine, 1999
Günter Grass, born in Free City of Danzig, now Poland, Literature, 1999
Horst L. Störmer, Physics, 1998
Paul J. Crutzen, Chemistry, 1995
Christiane Nüsslein-Volhard, Physiology or Medicine, 1995
Reinhard Selten, Economics, 1994
Bert Sakmann, Physiology or Medicine, 1991
Erwin Neher, Physiology or Medicine, 1991
Hans G. Dehmelt*, Physics, 1989
Wolfgang Paul, Physics, 1989
Johann Deisenhofer, Chemistry, 1988
Robert Huber, Chemistry, 1988
Hartmut Michel, Chemistry, 1988
Jack Steinberger*, Physics, 1988
J. Georg Bednorz, Physics, 1987
John Polanyi*, Chemistry, 1986
Ernst Ruska, Physics, 1986
Gerd Binnig, Physics, 1986
Klaus von Klitzing, Physics, 1985
Georges J.F. Köhler*, Physiology or Medicine, 1984
Georg Wittig, Chemistry, 1979
Arno Penzias*, Physics, 1978
Henry Kissinger*, Peace, 1978
Ernst Otto Fischer, Chemistry, 1973
Karl von Frisch, born in Austria-Hungary, now Austria, Physiology or Medicine, 1973
Heinrich Böll, Literature, 1972
Gerhard Herzberg*, Chemistry, 1971
Willy Brandt, Peace, 1971	
Bernard Katz*, Physiology or Medicine, 1970
Max Delbrück*, Physiology or Medicine, 1969
Manfred Eigen, Chemistry, 1967
Hans Bethe*, Physics, 1967
Nelly Sachs*, Literature, 1966
Feodor Felix Konrad Lynen, Physiology or Medicine, 1964
Konrad Bloch*, Physiology or Medicine, 1964
Karl Ziegler, Chemistry, 1963
Maria Goeppert-Mayer*, Physics, 1963
J. Hans D. Jensen, Physics, 1963
Rudolf Mössbauer, Physics, 1961
Werner Forssmann, Physiology or Medicine, 1956
Polykarp Kusch*, Physics, 1955
Max Born*, Physics, 1954
Walther Bothe, Physics, 1954
Hermann Staudinger, Chemistry, 1953
Fritz Albert Lipmann*, Physiology or Medicine, 1953
Hans Adolf Krebs*, Physiology or Medicine, 1953
Albert Schweitzer*, Peace, 1952
Otto Diels, Chemistry, 1950
Kurt Alder, Chemistry, 1950
Hermann Hesse*, Literature, 1946
Ernst Boris Chain*, Physiology or Medicine, 1945
Otto Hahn, Chemistry, 1944
Otto Stern*, Physics, 1943
Adolf Butenandt, Chemistry, 1939
Gerhard Domagk, Physiology or Medicine, 1939
Richard Kuhn, born in Austria-Hungary, now Austria, Chemistry, 1938
Otto Loewi*, Physiology or Medicine, 1936
Carl von Ossietzky, Peace, 1935
Hans Spemann, Physiology or Medicine, 1935
Werner Karl Heisenberg, Physics, 1932
Otto Heinrich Warburg, Physiology or Medicine, 1931
Carl Bosch, Chemistry, 1931	
Friedrich Bergius, Chemistry, 1931
Hans Fischer, Chemistry, 1930
Thomas Mann, Literature, 1929
Hans von Euler-Chelpin*, Chemistry, 1929
Adolf Otto Reinhold Windaus, Chemistry, 1928
Ludwig Quidde, Peace, 1927
Heinrich Otto Wieland, Chemistry, 1927
Gustav Stresemann, Peace, 1926
James Franck, Physics, 1925
Gustav Ludwig Hertz, Physics, 1925
Otto Fritz Meyerhof, Physiology or Medicine, 1922
Albert Einstein, Physics, 1921
Walther Nernst, Chemistry, 1920
Johannes Stark, Physics, 1919
Fritz Haber, Chemistry, 1918
Max Karl Ernst Ludwig Planck, Physics, 1918
Richard Willstätter, Chemistry, 1915
Max von Laue, Physics, 1914
Gerhart Hauptmann, born in Prussia, now Poland, Literature, 1912
Wilhelm Wien, Physics, 1911
Otto Wallach, Chemistry, 1910
Albrecht Kossel, Physiology or Medicine, 1910
Paul Johann Ludwig Heyse, Literature, 1910
Karl Ferdinand Braun, Physics, 1909
Wilhelm Ostwald, born in Russia, now Latvia, Chemistry, 1909
Rudolf Christoph Eucken, Literature, 1908
Paul Ehrlich, Physiology or Medicine, 1908
Eduard Buchner, Chemistry, 1907
Robert Koch, Physiology or Medicine, 1905
Philipp Lenard, born in Pressburg, Kingdom of Hungary, Austrian Empire, now Slovakia, Physics, 1905
Adolf von Baeyer, Chemistry, 1905
Hermann Emil Fischer, Chemistry, 1902
Theodor Mommsen, born in Duchy of Schleswig, Literature, 1902
Emil Adolf von Behring, Physiology or Medicine, 1901
Wilhelm Conrad Röntgen, Physics, 1901

Ghana
Kofi Annan, Peace, 2001

Greece
Odysseas Elytis, Literature, 1979
Giorgos Seferis, (born in then Ottoman Empire, now Turkey), Literature, 1963

Guatemala
Rigoberta Menchú, Peace, 1992
Miguel Ángel Asturias, Literature, 1967

Hong Kong
Charles K. Kao, Physics, 2009

Hungary

Avram Hershko*, as an Israeli citizen, Chemistry, 2004
Imre Kertész, Literature, 2002
George Andrew Olah, Chemistry, 1994
John Harsanyi, Economics, 1994
John Polanyi, born in Germany, Chemistry, 1986
Dennis Gabor, Physics, 1971
Eugene Wigner, Physics, 1963
Georg von Békésy, Physiology or Medicine, 1961
George de Hevesy, Chemistry, 1943
Albert Szent-Györgyi, Physiology or Medicine, 1937
Richard Adolf Zsigmondy, Chemistry, 1925
Róbert Bárány, born in Austria, Medicine, 1914
Philipp Lenard, Physics, 1905

Iceland
Halldór Laxness, Literature, 1955

India

Abhijit Banerjee*, Economics, 2019
Kailash Satyarthi, Peace, 2014
Venkatraman Ramakrishnan*, Chemistry, 2009
Amartya Sen, Economics, 1998
Subramanyan Chandrasekhar*, Physics, 1983
Mother Teresa, born in then Ottoman Empire, now North Macedonia, Peace, 1979
Har Gobind Khorana*, Medicine, 1968
C. V. Raman born in then British India, Physics, 1930
Rabindranath Tagore born in then British India, Literature, 1913
Rudyard Kipling*, Literature, 1907
Ronald Ross*, Medicine, 1902

Iran
Shirin Ebadi, Peace, 2003

Iraq
Nadia Murad, Peace, 2018

Ireland
William C. Campbell, Physiology or Medicine, 2015
John Hume, Peace, 1998
David Trimble, Peace, 1998
Séamus Heaney, Literature, 1995
Mairead Corrigan, Peace, 1976
Betty Williams, Peace, 1976
Seán MacBride, born in France, Peace, 1974
Samuel Beckett, Literature, 1969
Ernest Walton, Physics, 1951
George Bernard Shaw*, Literature, 1925
W. B. Yeats, Literature, 1923

Israel

Joshua Angrist, born in the United States, Economics, 2021
Arieh Warshel, Chemistry, 2013
Michael Levitt, born in South Africa, Chemistry, 2013
Dan Shechtman, Chemistry, 2011
Ada Yonath, Chemistry, 2009
Robert Aumann, born in Germany, moved to Israel from the United States, Economics, 2005
Aaron Ciechanover, Chemistry, 2004
Avram Hershko, born in Hungary, Chemistry, 2004
Daniel Kahneman*, Economics, 2002
Yitzhak Rabin, Peace, 1994
Shimon Peres, born in Poland, now Belarus, Peace, 1994
Menachem Begin, born in Russia, now Belarus, Peace, 1978
Shmuel Yosef Agnon, born in Austria-Hungary, now Ukraine, Literature, 1966

Italy

Giorgio Parisi, Physics, 2021
Mario R. Capecchi*, Physiology or Medicine, 2007
Riccardo Giacconi*, Physics, 2002
Dario Fo, Literature, 1997
Rita Levi-Montalcini, Physiology or Medicine, 1986
Franco Modigliani*, Economics, 1985
Carlo Rubbia, Physics, 1984
Eugenio Montale, Literature, 1975
Renato Dulbecco*, Physiology or Medicine, 1975
Salvador Luria*, Physiology or Medicine, 1969
Giulio Natta, Chemistry, 1963
Emilio Segrè*, Physics, 1959
Salvatore Quasimodo, Literature, 1959
Daniel Bovet, born in Switzerland, Physiology or Medicine, 1957
Enrico Fermi, Physics, 1938
Luigi Pirandello, Literature, 1934
Grazia Deledda, Literature, 1926
Guglielmo Marconi, Physics, 1909
Ernesto Teodoro Moneta, Peace, 1907
Camillo Golgi, Physiology or Medicine, 1906
Giosuè Carducci, Literature, 1906

Japan

Syukuro Manabe*, Physics, 2021
Akira Yoshino, Chemistry, 2019
Tasuku Honjo, Physiology or Medicine, 2018
Kazuo Ishiguro*, Literature, 2017
Yoshinori Ohsumi, Physiology or Medicine, 2016
Takaaki Kajita, Physics, 2015
Satoshi Ōmura, Physiology or Medicine, 2015
Shuji Nakamura*, Physics, 2014
Hiroshi Amano, Physics, 2014
Isamu Akasaki, Physics, 2014
Shinya Yamanaka, Physiology or Medicine, 2012
Akira Suzuki, Chemistry, 2010
Ei-ichi Negishi, Born in China, Chemistry, 2010
Osamu Shimomura, Chemistry, 2008
Toshihide Maskawa, Physics, 2008
Makoto Kobayashi, Physics, 2008
Yoichiro Nambu*, Physics, 2008
Koichi Tanaka, Chemistry, 2002
Masatoshi Koshiba, Physics, 2002
Ryōji Noyori, Chemistry, 2001
Hideki Shirakawa, Chemistry, 2000
Kenzaburō Ōe, Literature, 1994
Susumu Tonegawa, Physiology or Medicine, 1987
Kenichi Fukui, Chemistry, 1981
Eisaku Satō, Peace, 1974
Leo Esaki, Physics, 1973
Yasunari Kawabata, Literature, 1968
Sin-Itiro Tomonaga, Physics, 1965
Hideki Yukawa, Physics, 1949

Kenya
Wangari Maathai, Peace, 2004

Lebanon

Ardem Patapoutian*, Physiology or Medicine, 2021

Latvia 

 Wilhelm Ostwald*, Chemistry, 1909

Liberia
Ellen Johnson Sirleaf, Peace, 2011
Leymah Gbowee, Peace, 2011

Lithuania
Aaron Klug*, Chemistry, 1982

Luxembourg
Jules A. Hoffmann*, Physiology or Medicine, 2011
Gabriel Lippmann*, Physics, 1908

North Macedonia
Mother Teresa*, born in then Ottoman Empire, now North Macedonia, Peace, 1979

Mexico
Mario José Molina Henríquez*, Chemistry, 1995
Octavio Paz Lozano, Literature, 1990
Alfonso García Robles, Peace, 1982

Myanmar (Burma)

Aung San Suu Kyi, Peace, 1991

Morocco

Serge Haroche*, Physics, 2012

Netherlands
Guido Imbens, Economics, 2021
Ben Feringa, Chemistry, 2016
Organisation for the Prohibition of Chemical Weapons, Peace, 2013
Andre Geim, born in Soviet Union, now Russia, Physics, 2010
Martinus J. G. Veltman, Physics, 1999
Gerard 't Hooft, Physics, 1999
Paul J. Crutzen, Chemistry, 1995
Simon van der Meer, Physics, 1984
Nicolaas Bloembergen*, Physics, 1981
Tjalling C. Koopmans, Economics, 1975
Nikolaas Tinbergen*, Physiology or Medicine, 1973
Jan Tinbergen, Economics, 1969
Frits Zernike, Physics, 1953
Peter Debye, Chemistry, 1936
Christiaan Eijkman, Physiology or Medicine, 1929
Willem Einthoven, Physiology or Medicine, 1924
Heike Kamerlingh Onnes, Physics, 1913
Tobias Asser, Peace, 1911
Johannes Diderik van der Waals, Physics, 1910
Pieter Zeeman, Physics, 1902
Hendrik Lorentz, Physics, 1902
Jacobus Henricus van 't Hoff, Chemistry, 1901

New Zealand
Alan MacDiarmid, Chemistry, 2000 
Maurice Wilkins, Physiology or Medicine, 1962
Ernest Rutherford*, Chemistry, 1908

Nigeria
Wole Soyinka, Literature, 1986

Norway
May-Britt Moser, Physiology or Medicine, 2014
Edvard Moser, Physiology or Medicine, 2014
Finn E. Kydland, Economics, 2004
Trygve Haavelmo, Economics, 1989
Ivar Giaever, Physics, 1973
Ragnar Frisch, Economics, 1969
Odd Hassel, Chemistry, 1969
Lars Onsager, Chemistry, 1968
Sigrid Undset, Literature, 1928
Fridtjof Nansen, Peace, 1922
Christian Lous Lange, Peace, 1921
Knut Hamsun, Literature, 1920
Bjørnstjerne Bjørnson, Literature, 1903

Pakistan

Malala Yousafzai, Peace, 2014
Abdus Salam, born in British India, (now Pakistan), Physics, 1979
Har Gobind Khorana*, born in British India, (now Pakistan), Medicine, 1968

Palestine
Yasser Arafat, Born in Cairo, Egypt, Peace, 1994

Peru
Mario Vargas Llosa*, Literature, 2010

Philippines

Maria Ressa, Peace, 2021

Poland

Olga Tokarczuk, Literature, 2018
Leonid Hurwicz*, born in then Russian Republic (now Russia), Economics, 2007
Wisława Szymborska, Literature, 1996
Joseph Rotblat*, born in Congress Poland (Russian Empire), Peace, 1995
Shimon Peres*, as an Israeli citizen, Peace, 1994
Georges Charpak*, born in Dąbrowica Poland (now in Ukraine), Physics, 1992
Lech Wałęsa, born in Popowo, Reichsgau Danzig-West Prussia, Germany (today  Poland), Peace, 1983
Roald Hoffmann*, born in Złoczów Poland (now in Ukraine), Chemistry, 1981
Czesław Miłosz*, born in Russian Empire, now Lithuania, Literature, 1980
Isaac Bashevis Singer*, born in Congress Poland (Russian Empire), Literature, 1978
Menachem Begin*, as an Israeli citizen, he also had Polish citizenship, Peace, 1978
Andrew Schally*, born in Vilnius, Poland (now Vilnius, Lithuania), Physiology or Medicine, 1977
Tadeusz Reichstein*, born in Congress Poland (Russian Empire), Physiology or Medicine, 1950
Isidor Isaac Rabi*, born in Rymanów, Austria-Hungary (now in Poland), Physics, 1944
Władysław Reymont, born in Congress Poland (Russian Empire), Literature, 1924
Marie Skłodowska-Curie, born in Congress Poland (Russian Empire), Chemistry, 1911
Albert A. Michelson*, born in Strelno, North German Confederation (now in Poland), Physics, 1907
Henryk Sienkiewicz, born in Congress Poland (Russian Empire), Literature, 1905
Marie Skłodowska-Curie, born in Congress Poland (Russian Empire), Physics, 1903

Portugal
José de Sousa Saramago, Literature, 1998
Carlos Filipe Ximenes Belo*, born in then Portuguese Timor, now East Timor, Peace, 1996
José Ramos-Horta*, born in then Portuguese Timor, now East Timor, Peace, 1996
António Egas Moniz, Physiology or Medicine, 1949

Romania
Stefan Hell*, Chemistry, 2014
Herta Müller*, Literature, 2009
Elie Wiesel*, Peace, 1986
George E. Palade*, Physiology or Medicine, 1974

Russia and Soviet Union

Memorial, Peace, 2022
Dmitry Muratov, Peace, 2021
Andre Geim*, Physics, 2010
Konstantin Novoselov*, Physics, 2010
Leonid Hurwicz*, Economics, 2007
Alexei Alexeyevich Abrikosov*, Physics, 2003
Vitaly Ginzburg, Physics, 2003
Zhores Alferov, born in then Soviet Union, now Belarus, Physics, 2000
Mikhail Gorbachev, Peace, 1990
Joseph Brodsky, born in Russia, Literature, 1987
Pyotr Kapitsa, Physics, 1978
Menachem Begin*, as an Israeli citizen, Peace, 1978
Ilya Prigogine*, Chemistry, 1977
Andrei Sakharov, Peace, 1975
Leonid Kantorovich, Economics, 1975
Simon Kuznets, now Belarus, Economics, 1971
Aleksandr Solzhenitsyn, Literature, 1970
Mikhail Sholokhov, Literature, 1965
Nikolay Basov, Physics, 1964
Alexander Prokhorov, born in Australia, Physics, 1964
Lev Landau, born in then Russian Empire, now Azerbaijan, laureate when citizen of the Soviet Union, Physics, 1962
Boris Pasternak, Literature, 1958 (forced to decline)
Pavel Cherenkov, Physics, 1958
Igor Tamm, Physics, 1958
Ilya Mikhailovich Frank, Physics, 1958
Nikolay Semyonov, Chemistry, 1956
Ivan Bunin*, Literature, 1933
Élie Metchnikoff, born in now Ukraine, Physiology or Medicine, 1908
Ivan Pavlov, Physiology or Medicine, 1904

Saint Lucia
Derek Walcott, Literature, 1992
W. Arthur Lewis*, Economics, 1979

Slovenia
Friderik Pregl*, born in Austria-Hungary, now Slovenia, Chemistry, 1923

South Africa

Michael Levitt*, Chemistry, 2013
J. M. Coetzee, Literature, 2003
Sydney Brenner*, Physiology or Medicine, 2002
F. W. de Klerk, Peace, 1993
Nelson Mandela, Peace, 1993
Nadine Gordimer, Literature, 1991
Desmond Tutu, Peace, 1984
Aaron Klug*, Chemistry, 1982
Allan M. Cormack*, Physiology or Medicine, 1979
Albert Lutuli, born in then Rhodesia, now Zimbabwe, Peace, 1960
Max Theiler, Physiology or Medicine, 1951

South Korea

Kim Dae-jung, Peace, 2000

Spain

Mario Vargas Llosa, born in Peru, Literature, 2010
Camilo José Cela, Literature, 1989
Vicente Aleixandre, Literature, 1977
Severo Ochoa*, Physiology or Medicine, 1959
Juan Ramón Jiménez, Literature, 1956
Jacinto Benavente, Literature, 1922
Santiago Ramón y Cajal, Physiology or Medicine, 1906
José Echegaray, Literature, 1904
Alfonso García Robles, Peace, 1982

Sweden

Svante Pääbo, Physiology or Medicine, 2022
Tomas Lindahl, Chemistry, 2015
Tomas Tranströmer, Literature, 2011
Arvid Carlsson, Physiology or Medicine, 2000
Alva Myrdal, Peace, 1982
Sune Bergström, Physiology or Medicine, 1982
Bengt I. Samuelsson, Physiology or Medicine, 1982
Kai Siegbahn, Physics, 1981
Torsten Wiesel, Physiology or Medicine, 1981
Bertil Ohlin, Economics, 1977
Eyvind Johnson, Literature, 1974
Harry Martinson, Literature, 1974
Gunnar Myrdal, Economics, 1974
Ulf von Euler, Physiology or Medicine, 1970
Hannes Alfvén, Physics, 1970
Ragnar Granit, born in the Grand Duchy of Finland, then a part of Russia, Physiology or Medicine, 1967
Nelly Sachs, born in Germany, Literature, 1966
Dag Hammarskjöld, Peace, 1961 (posthumously)
Hugo Theorell, Physiology or Medicine, 1955
Pär Lagerkvist, Literature, 1951
Arne Tiselius, Chemistry, 1948
Erik Axel Karlfeldt, Literature, 1931 (posthumously)
Nathan Söderblom, Peace, 1930
Hans von Euler-Chelpin, born in Germany, Chemistry, 1929
Theodor Svedberg, Chemistry, 1926
Karl Manne Siegbahn, Physics, 1924
Hjalmar Branting, Peace, 1921
Carl Gustaf Verner von Heidenstam, Literature, 1916
Gustaf Dalén, Physics, 1912
Allvar Gullstrand, Physiology or Medicine, 1911
Selma Lagerlöf, Literature, 1909
Klas Pontus Arnoldson, Peace, 1908
Svante Arrhenius, Chemistry, 1903

Switzerland
Michel Mayor, Physics, 2019
Didier Queloz, Physics, 2019
Jacques Dubochet, Chemistry, 2017
Kurt Wüthrich, Chemistry, 2002
Rolf M. Zinkernagel, Physiology or Medicine, 1996
Edmond H. Fischer, Physiology or Medicine,1992
Richard R. Ernst, Chemistry, 1991
Karl Alexander Müller, Physics, 1987
Heinrich Rohrer, Physics, 1986
Werner Arber, Physiology or Medicine, 1978
Vladimir Prelog, born in Austria-Hungary, now Bosnia-Herzegovina, Chemistry, 1975
Daniel Bovet, Physiology or Medicine, 1957
Felix Bloch, Physics, 1952
Tadeusz Reichstein, Physiology or Medicine, 1950
Walter Rudolf Hess, Physiology or Medicine, 1949
Paul Hermann Müller, Physiology or Medicine, 1948
Hermann Hesse, born in Germany, Literature, 1946
Leopold Ružička, born in Kingdom of Croatia-Slavonia, Austria-Hungary, now Croatia, Chemistry, 1939
Paul Karrer, Chemistry, 1937
Albert Einstein, born in Germany, Physics, 1921
Charles Édouard Guillaume, Physics, 1920
Carl Spitteler, Literature, 1919
Alfred Werner, Chemistry, 1913
Theodor Kocher, Physiology or Medicine, 1909
Élie Ducommun, Peace, 1902
Charles Albert Gobat, Peace, 1902
Henry Dunant, Peace, 1901

Taiwan (Republic of China)

Yuan T. Lee, Chemistry, 1986*
Samuel C. C. Ting, Physics 1976*
Chen-Ning Yang, Physics, 1957*
Tsung-Dao Lee, Physics, 1957*

Tanzania
Abdulrazak Gurnah*, Literature, 2021

Tibet
14th Dalai Lama, Peace, 1989

Trinidad and Tobago
V. S. Naipaul*, Literature, 2001

Tunisia
Tunisian National Dialogue Quartet, Peace, 2015.

Turkey
Aziz Sancar, Chemistry, 2015
Orhan Pamuk, Literature, 2006
Giorgos Seferis*, (born in then Ottoman Empire, now Turkey), Literature, 1963

Ukraine

Centre for Civil Liberties, Peace, 2022
Svetlana Alexievich*, born in Ukraine, Literature, 2015
Georges Charpak*, born in Ukraine, Physics, 1992
Roald Hoffmann*, born in Ukraine, Chemistry, 1981
Shmuel Yosef Agnon*, born in Ukraine, Literature, 1966
Selman Waksman*, born in Ukraine, Physiology or Medicine, 1952
Ilya Ilyich Mechnikov, Physiology or Medicine, 1908

United Kingdom

Abdulrazak Gurnah, born in Tanzania, Literature, 2021 
David MacMillan, Chemistry, 2021 
Roger Penrose, Physics, 2020
Michael Houghton, Physiology or Medicine, 2020 
Peter J. Ratcliffe, Physiology or Medicine, 2019
M. Stanley Whittingham, Chemistry, 2019
Greg Winter, Chemistry, 2018
Kazuo Ishiguro, born in Japan, Literature, 2017
Richard Henderson, Chemistry, 2017
Oliver Hart, Economics, 2016
Fraser Stoddart, Chemistry, 2016
David J. Thouless, Physics, 2016
F. Duncan M. Haldane, Physics, 2016
John M. Kosterlitz, Physics, 2016
Angus Deaton, Economics, 2015
Tomas Lindahl, born in Sweden, Chemistry, 2015
John O'Keefe, born in the United States, Physiology or Medicine, 2014
Michael Levitt, born in South Africa, Chemistry, 2013
Peter Higgs, Physics, 2013
John B. Gurdon, Physiology or Medicine, 2012
Christopher A. Pissarides, born in Cyprus, Economics, 2010
Konstantin Novoselov, born in Russia, Physics, 2010
Robert G. Edwards, Physiology or Medicine, 2010
Charles K. Kao, Physics, 2009
Venkatraman Ramakrishnan, born in India, Chemistry, 2009
Jack W. Szostak, born in United Kingdom, Physiology or Medicine, 2009
Doris Lessing, born in Iran, Literature, 2007
Sir Martin J. Evans, Physiology or Medicine, 2007
Oliver Smithies*, Physiology or Medicine, 2007
Harold Pinter, Literature, 2005
Clive W. J. Granger, Economics, 2003
Anthony J. Leggett*, Physics, 2003
Peter Mansfield, Physiology or Medicine, 2003
Sydney Brenner, born in South Africa, Physiology or Medicine, 2002
John E. Sulston, Physiology or Medicine, 2002
Tim Hunt, Physiology or Medicine, 2001
Paul Nurse, Physiology or Medicine, 2001
V. S. Naipaul, born in Trinidad, Literature, 2001
David Trimble, Peace, 1998
John Pople, Chemistry, 1998
John E. Walker, Chemistry, 1997
Harold Kroto, Chemistry, 1996
James A. Mirrlees, Economics, 1996
Joseph Rotblat, born in then Russian Empire, now Poland, Peace, 1995
Richard J. Roberts, Physiology or Medicine, 1993
Michael Smith*, Chemistry, 1993
Ronald Coase, based in the United States, Economics, 1991
James W. Black, Physiology or Medicine, 1988
César Milstein, born in Argentina, Physiology or Medicine, 1984
Richard Stone, Economics, 1984
William Golding, Literature, 1983
Aaron Klug, born in Lithuania, Chemistry, 1982
John Robert Vane, Physiology or Medicine, 1982
Elias Canetti, born in Bulgaria, Literature, 1981
Frederick Sanger, Chemistry, 1980
W. Arthur Lewis, born on St. Lucia, Economics, 1979
Godfrey Hounsfield, Physiology or Medicine, 1979
Peter D. Mitchell, Chemistry, 1978
James Meade, Economics, 1977
Nevill Francis Mott, Physics, 1977
Amnesty International, Peace, 1977
Mairead Corrigan, Peace, 1976
Betty Williams, Peace, 1976
John Cornforth, born in Australia, Chemistry, 1975
Christian de Duve*, Physiology or Medicine, 1974
Friedrich Hayek, born in Austria, Economics, 1974
Martin Ryle, Physics, 1974
Antony Hewish, Physics, 1974
Patrick White*, Literature, 1973
Geoffrey Wilkinson, Chemistry, 1973
Brian David Josephson, Physics, 1973
Nikolaas Tinbergen, born in the Netherlands, Physiology or Medicine, 1973
Rodney Robert Porter, Physiology or Medicine, 1972
John Hicks, Economics, 1972
Dennis Gabor, born in Hungary, Physics, 1971
Bernard Katz, born in Germany, Physiology or Medicine, 1970
Derek Harold Richard Barton, Chemistry, 1969
Ronald George Wreyford Norrish, Chemistry, 1967
George Porter, Chemistry, 1967
Dorothy Crowfoot Hodgkin, Chemistry, 1964
Andrew Huxley, Physiology or Medicine, 1963
Alan Lloyd Hodgkin, Physiology or Medicine, 1963
John Kendrew, Chemistry, 1962
Max Perutz, born in Austria, Chemistry, 1962
Francis Crick, Physiology or Medicine, 1962
Maurice Wilkins, born in New Zealand, Physiology or Medicine, 1962
Peter Medawar, born in Brazil, Physiology or Medicine, 1960
Philip Noel-Baker, Peace, 1959
Frederick Sanger, Chemistry, 1958
Alexander R. Todd, Baron Todd, Chemistry, 1957
Cyril Norman Hinshelwood, Chemistry, 1956
Max Born, born in then Germany, now Poland, Physics, 1954
Winston Churchill, Literature, 1953
Hans Adolf Krebs, born in Germany, Physiology or Medicine, 1953
Archer John Porter Martin, Chemistry, 1952
Richard Laurence Millington Synge, Chemistry, 1952
John Cockcroft, Physics, 1951
Bertrand Russell, Literature, 1950
Cecil Frank Powell, Physics, 1950
John Boyd Orr, Peace, 1949
T. S. Eliot, born in the United States, Literature, 1948
Patrick Blackett, Baron Blackett, Physics, 1948
Edward Victor Appleton, Physics, 1947
Robert Robinson, Chemistry, 1947
Friends Service Council, Peace, 1947
Ernst Boris Chain, born in Germany, Physiology or Medicine, 1945
Alexander Fleming, Physiology or Medicine, 1945
George Paget Thomson, Physics, 1937
Robert Cecil, 1st Viscount Cecil of Chelwood, Peace, 1937
Norman Haworth, Chemistry, 1937
Henry Hallett Dale, Physiology or Medicine, 1936
James Chadwick, Physics, 1935
Arthur Henderson, Peace, 1934
Norman Angell, Peace, 1933
Paul Dirac, Physics, 1933
Charles Scott Sherrington, Physiology or Medicine, 1932
John Galsworthy, Literature, 1932
Edgar Adrian, 1st Baron Adrian, Physiology or Medicine, 1932
Arthur Harden, Chemistry, 1929
Frederick Hopkins, Physiology or Medicine, 1929
Owen Willans Richardson, Physics, 1928
Charles Thomson Rees Wilson, Physics, 1927
Austen Chamberlain, Peace, 1925
George Bernard Shaw, born in Ireland (Then part of the United Kingdom of Great Britain and Ireland), Literature, 1925
John James Rickard Macleod*, Physiology or Medicine, 1923
Archibald Vivian Hill, Physiology or Medicine, 1922
Francis William Aston, Chemistry, 1922
Frederick Soddy, Chemistry, 1921
Charles Glover Barkla, Physics, 1917
William Henry Bragg, Physics, 1915
William Lawrence Bragg, born in Australia, Physics, 1915
Ernest Rutherford, born in New Zealand, Chemistry, 1908
Rudyard Kipling, born in India, Literature, 1907
J. J. Thomson, Physics, 1906
John Strutt, 3rd Baron Rayleigh, Physics, 1904
William Ramsay, Chemistry, 1904
William Randal Cremer, Peace, 1903
Ronald Ross, born in India, Physiology or Medicine, 1902

United States

Ben Bernanke, Economics, 2022
Douglas Diamond, Economics, 2022
Philip H. Dybvig, Economics, 2022
Carolyn R. Bertozzi, Chemistry, 2022
K. Barry Sharpless, Chemistry, 2022
John Clauser, Physics, 2022
David Card, born in Canada, Economics, 2021
Joshua Angrist, Economics, 2021
Guido Imbens, born in Netherlands, Economics, 2021
Maria Ressa, born in Philippines, Peace, 2021
Syukuro Manabe, born in Japan, Physics, 2021
David MacMillan, born in United Kingdom, Chemistry, 2021
David Julius, Physiology or Medicine, 2021
Ardem Patapoutian, born in Lebanon, Physiology or Medicine, 2021
Robert B. Wilson, Economics, 2020
Paul R. Milgrom, Economics, 2020
Louise Glück, Literature, 2020
Jennifer Doudna, Chemistry, 2020
Andrea Ghez, Physics, 2020
Harvey J. Alter, Physiology or Medicine, 2020
Charles M. Rice, Physiology or Medicine, 2020
Abhijit Banerjee, born in India, Economics, 2019
Esther Duflo, born in France, Economics, 2019
Michael Kremer, Economics, 2019
John B. Goodenough, born in Germany, Chemistry, 2019
M. Stanley Whittingham, born in United Kingdom, Chemistry, 2019
Jim Peebles, born in Canada, Physics, 2019
William Kaelin Jr., Physiology or Medicine, 2019
Gregg L. Semenza, Physiology or Medicine, 2019
Paul Romer, Economics, 2018
William Nordhaus, Economics, 2018
George P. Smith, Chemistry, 2018
Frances Arnold, Chemistry, 2018
Arthur Ashkin, Physics, 2018
James Allison, Physiology or Medicine, 2018
Richard H. Thaler, Economics, 2017
Joachim Frank, born in Germany, Chemistry, 2017
Rainer Weiss, born in Germany, Physics, 2017 
Kip Thorne, Physics, 2017 
Barry Barish, Physics, 2017 
Michael W. Young, Physiology or Medicine, 2017
Michael Rosbash, Physiology or Medicine, 2017
Jeffrey C. Hall, Physiology or Medicine, 2017
Bob Dylan, Literature, 2016
Oliver Hart, born in United Kingdom, Economics, 2016
Fraser Stoddart, born in United Kingdom, Chemistry, 2016
F. Duncan M. Haldane, born in United Kingdom, Physics, 2016
John M. Kosterlitz, born in United Kingdom, Physics, 2016
Angus Deaton, born in United Kingdom, Economics, 2015
Paul L. Modrich, Chemistry, 2015
Aziz Sancar, born in Turkey, Chemistry, 2015
William C. Campbell, born in Ireland, Physiology or Medicine, 2015
William E. Moerner, Chemistry, 2014
Eric Betzig, Chemistry, 2014
Shuji Nakamura, born in Japan, Physics, 2014
John O'Keefe*, Physiology or Medicine, 2014
Robert J. Shiller, Economics, 2013
Lars Peter Hansen, Economics, 2013
Eugene F. Fama, Economics, 2013
Arieh Warshel, born in Israel, Chemistry, 2013
Michael Levitt, born in South Africa, Chemistry, 2013
Martin Karplus, born in Austria, Chemistry, 2013
Randy Schekman, Physiology or Medicine, 2013
Thomas C. Südhof, born in Germany, Physiology or Medicine, 2013
James Rothman, Physiology or Medicine, 2013
Alvin E. Roth, Economics, 2012
Lloyd S. Shapley, Economics, 2012
Brian K. Kobilka, Chemistry, 2012
Robert J. Lefkowitz, Chemistry, 2012
David J. Wineland, Physics, 2012
Christopher A. Sims, Economics, 2011
Thomas J. Sargent, Economics, 2011
Saul Perlmutter, Physics, 2011
Brian P. Schmidt, Physics, 2011
Adam G. Riess, Physics, 2011
Ralph M. Steinman, born in Canada, Physiology or Medicine, 2011
Bruce Beutler, Physiology or Medicine, 2011
Peter A. Diamond, Economics, 2010
Dale T. Mortensen, Economics, 2010
Ei-ichi Negishi, Japanese citizenship, Chemistry, 2010
Richard F. Heck, Chemistry, 2010
Elinor Ostrom, Economics, 2009
Oliver Eaton Williamson, Economics, 2009
Barack H. Obama, Peace, 2009
Venkatraman Ramakrishnan, born in India, Chemistry, 2009
Thomas A. Steitz, Chemistry, 2009
Willard S. Boyle, born in Canada, Physics, 2009
Charles K. Kao, born in China, Physics, 2009
George E. Smith, Physics, 2009
Elizabeth Blackburn, born in Australia, Physiology or Medicine, 2009
Carol W. Greider, Physiology or Medicine, 2009
Jack W. Szostak, born in United Kingdom, Physiology or Medicine, 2009
Paul Krugman, Economics, 2008
Roger Yonchien Tsien, Chemistry, 2008
Martin Chalfie, Chemistry, 2008
Osamu Shimomura, Japanese citizenship , Chemistry, 2008
Yoichiro Nambu, born in Japan, Physics, 2008
Leonid Hurwicz, born in Russia, Economics, 2007
Eric S. Maskin, Economics, 2007
Roger B. Myerson, Economics, 2007
Al Gore, Peace, 2007
Mario R. Capecchi, born in Italy, Physiology or Medicine, 2007
Oliver Smithies, born in United Kingdom, Physiology or Medicine, 2007
Roger D. Kornberg, Chemistry, 2006
John C. Mather, Physics, 2006
Edmund S. Phelps, Economics, 2006
George F. Smoot, Physics, 2006
Andrew Z. Fire, Physiology or Medicine, 2006
Craig C. Mello, Physiology or Medicine, 2006
Robert Aumann*, as an Israeli citizen, Economics, 2005
Robert H. Grubbs, Chemistry, 2005
Richard R. Schrock, Chemistry, 2005
Thomas Schelling, Economics, 2005
John L. Hall, Physics, 2005
Roy J. Glauber, Physics, 2005
Irwin Rose, Chemistry, 2004
Edward C. Prescott, Economics, 2004
David J. Gross, Physics, 2004
H. David Politzer, Physics, 2004
Frank Wilczek, Physics, 2004
Richard Axel, Physiology or Medicine, 2004
Linda B. Buck, Physiology or Medicine, 2004
Peter Agre, Chemistry, 2003
Roderick MacKinnon, Chemistry, 2003
Robert F. Engle, Economics, 2003
Anthony J. Leggett, born in United Kingdom, Physics, 2003
Paul C. Lauterbur, Physiology or Medicine, 2003
Alexei Alexeyevich Abrikosov, born in Russia, Physics, 2003
Daniel Kahneman, born in Israel, Economics, 2002
Vernon L. Smith, Economics, 2002
Jimmy Carter, Peace, 2002
John Bennett Fenn, Chemistry, 2002
Raymond Davis Jr., Physics, 2002
Riccardo Giacconi, born in Italy, Physics, 2002
Sydney Brenner, born in South Africa, Physiology or Medicine, 2002
H. Robert Horvitz, Physiology or Medicine, 2002
William S. Knowles, Chemistry, 2001
K. Barry Sharpless, Chemistry, 2001
Joseph E. Stiglitz, Economics, 2001
George A. Akerlof, Economics, 2001
A. Michael Spence, Economics, 2001
Eric A. Cornell, Physics, 2001
Carl E. Wieman, Physics, 2001
Leland H. Hartwell, Physiology or Medicine, 2001
Alan Heeger, Chemistry, 2000
Alan MacDiarmid, born in New Zealand, Chemistry, 2000
James J. Heckman, Economics, 2000
Daniel L. McFadden, Economics, 2000
Jack Kilby, Physics, 2000
Paul Greengard, Physiology or Medicine, 2000
Eric Kandel, born in Austria, Physiology or Medicine, 2000
Ahmed H. Zewail, born in Egypt, Chemistry, 1999
Günter Blobel, born in then Germany, now Poland, Physiology or Medicine, 1999
Walter Kohn, born in Austria, Chemistry, 1998
Horst Ludwig Störmer, born in Germany, Physics, 1998
Robert B. Laughlin, Physics, 1998
Daniel C. Tsui, born in China, Physics, 1998
Robert F. Furchgott, Physiology or Medicine, 1998
Louis J. Ignarro, Physiology or Medicine, 1998
Ferid Murad, Physiology or Medicine, 1998
Paul D. Boyer, Chemistry, 1997
Robert C. Merton, Economics, 1997
Myron Scholes, born in Canada, Economics, 1997
Jody Williams, Peace, 1997
Steven Chu, Physics, 1997
William D. Phillips, Physics, 1997
Stanley B. Prusiner, Physiology or Medicine, 1997
Richard E. Smalley, Chemistry, 1996
Robert F. Curl Jr., Chemistry, 1996
William Vickrey, born in Canada, Economics, 1996
David M. Lee, Physics, 1996
Douglas D. Osheroff, Physics, 1996
Robert C. Richardson, Physics, 1996
Mario J. Molina, born in Mexico, Chemistry, 1995
F. Sherwood Rowland, Chemistry, 1995
Robert Lucas Jr., Economics, 1995
Martin L. Perl, Physics, 1995
Frederick Reines, Physics, 1995
Edward B. Lewis, Physiology or Medicine, 1995
Eric F. Wieschaus, Physiology or Medicine, 1995
George Andrew Olah, born in Hungary, Chemistry, 1994
John Harsanyi, born in Hungary, Economics, 1994
John Forbes Nash, Economics, 1994
Clifford G. Shull, Physics, 1994
Alfred G. Gilman, Physiology or Medicine, 1994
Martin Rodbell, Physiology or Medicine, 1994
Kary B. Mullis, Chemistry, 1993
Robert W. Fogel, Economics, 1993
Douglass C. North, Economics, 1993
Toni Morrison, Literature, 1993
Russell A. Hulse, Physics, 1993
Joseph H. Taylor Jr., Physics, 1993
Phillip A. Sharp, Physiology or Medicine, 1993
Rudolph A. Marcus, born in Canada, Chemistry, 1992
Gary S. Becker, Economics, 1992
Edmond H. Fischer, born in China, Physiology or Medicine, 1992
Edwin G. Krebs, Physiology or Medicine, 1992
Ronald Coase, born in the United Kingdom, Economics, 1991
Elias James Corey, Chemistry, 1990
Merton H. Miller, Economics, 1990
William F. Sharpe, Economics, 1990
Harry M. Markowitz, Economics, 1990
Jerome I. Friedman, Physics, 1990
Henry W. Kendall, Physics, 1990
Joseph E. Murray, Physiology or Medicine, 1990
E. Donnall Thomas, Physiology or Medicine, 1990
Sidney Altman, born in Canada, Chemistry, 1989
Thomas R. Cech, Chemistry, 1989
Hans G. Dehmelt, born in Germany, Physics, 1989
Norman F. Ramsey, Physics, 1989
J. Michael Bishop, Physiology or Medicine, 1989
Harold E. Varmus, Physiology or Medicine, 1989
Leon M. Lederman, Physics, 1988
Melvin Schwartz, Physics, 1988
Jack Steinberger, born in Germany, Physics, 1988
Gertrude B. Elion, Physiology or Medicine, 1988
George H. Hitchings, Physiology or Medicine, 1988
Charles J. Pedersen, born in Korea, Chemistry, 1987
Donald J. Cram, Chemistry, 1987
Robert M. Solow, Economics, 1987
Joseph Brodsky, born in Russia, Literature, 1987
Dudley R. Herschbach, Chemistry, 1986
Yuan T. Lee, born in Taiwan, Chemistry, 1986
James M. Buchanan, Economics, 1986
Elie Wiesel, born in Romania, Peace, 1986
Stanley Cohen, Physiology or Medicine, 1986
Rita Levi-Montalcini, born in Italy, Physiology or Medicine, 1986
Jerome Karle, Chemistry, 1985
Herbert A. Hauptman, Chemistry, 1985
Franco Modigliani, born in Italy, Economics, 1985
Michael S. Brown, Physiology or Medicine, 1985
Joseph L. Goldstein, Physiology or Medicine, 1985
Bruce Merrifield, Chemistry, 1984
Henry Taube, born in Canada, Chemistry, 1983
Gérard Debreu, born in France, Economics, 1983
William A. Fowler, Physics, 1983
Subrahmanyan Chandrasekhar, born in India, Physics, 1983
Barbara McClintock, Physiology or Medicine, 1983
George J. Stigler, Economics, 1982
Kenneth G. Wilson, Physics, 1982
Roald Hoffmann, born in then Poland, now Ukraine, Chemistry, 1981
James Tobin, Economics, 1981
Nicolaas Bloembergen, born in the Netherlands, Physics, 1981
Arthur L. Schawlow, Physics, 1981
David H. Hubel, born in Canada, Physiology or Medicine, 1981
Roger W. Sperry, Physiology or Medicine, 1981
Walter Gilbert, Chemistry, 1980
Paul Berg, Chemistry, 1980
Lawrence R. Klein, Economics, 1980
Czesław Miłosz, born in then Russian Empire, now Lithuania, Literature, 1980
James Cronin, Physics, 1980
Val Fitch, Physics, 1980
Baruj Benacerraf, born in Venezuela, Physiology or Medicine, 1980
George D. Snell, Physiology or Medicine, 1980
Herbert C. Brown, born in the United Kingdom, Chemistry, 1979
Theodore Schultz, Economics, 1979
Steven Weinberg, Physics, 1979
Sheldon Glashow, Physics, 1979
Allan M. Cormack, born in South Africa, Physiology or Medicine, 1979
Herbert A. Simon, Economics, 1978
Isaac Bashevis Singer, born in then Russian Empire, now Poland, Literature, 1978
Robert Woodrow Wilson, Physics, 1978
Arno Penzias, born in Germany, Physics, 1978
Hamilton O. Smith, Physiology or Medicine, 1978
Daniel Nathans, Physiology or Medicine, 1978
Philip Anderson, Physics, 1977
John H. van Vleck, Physics, 1977
Roger Guillemin, born in France, Physiology or Medicine, 1977
Andrew Schally, born in then Poland, now Lithuania, Physiology or Medicine, 1977
Rosalyn Yalow, Physiology or Medicine, 1977
William Lipscomb, Chemistry, 1976
Milton Friedman, Economics, 1976
Saul Bellow, born in Canada, Literature, 1976
Burton Richter, Physics, 1976
Samuel C. C. Ting, Physics, 1976
Baruch S. Blumberg, Physiology or Medicine, 1976
Daniel Carleton Gajdusek, Physiology or Medicine, 1976
Tjalling C. Koopmans, born in the Netherlands, Economics, 1975
Ben Roy Mottelson*, Physics, 1975
James Rainwater, Physics, 1975
David Baltimore, Physiology or Medicine, 1975
Renato Dulbecco, born in Italy, Physiology or Medicine, 1975
Howard Martin Temin, Physiology or Medicine, 1975
Paul J. Flory, Chemistry, 1974
George E. Palade, born in Romania, Physiology or Medicine, 1974
Wassily Leontief, born in Germany, Economics, 1973
Henry Kissinger, born in Germany, Peace, 1973 
Ivar Giaever, Norway, Physics, 1973
Christian Anfinsen, Chemistry, 1972
Stanford Moore, Chemistry, 1972
William H. Stein, Chemistry, 1972
Kenneth J. Arrow, Economics, 1972
John Bardeen, Physics, 1972
Leon N. Cooper, Physics, 1972
Robert Schrieffer, Physics, 1972
Gerald Edelman, Physiology or Medicine, 1972
Simon Kuznets, born in then Russia, now Belarus, Economics, 1971
Earl W. Sutherland Jr., Physiology or Medicine, 1971
Paul A. Samuelson, Economics, 1970
Norman Borlaug, Peace, 1970
Julius Axelrod, Physiology or Medicine, 1970
Murray Gell-Mann, Physics, 1969
Max Delbrück, born in Germany, Physiology or Medicine, 1969
Alfred Hershey, Physiology or Medicine, 1969
Salvador Luria, born in Italy, Physiology or Medicine, 1969
Lars Onsager, born in Norway, Chemistry, 1968
Luis Alvarez, Physics, 1968
Robert W. Holley, Physiology or Medicine, 1968
Har Gobind Khorana, born in India, Physiology or Medicine, 1968
Marshall Warren Nirenberg, Physiology or Medicine, 1968
Hans Bethe, born in then Germany, now France, Physics, 1967
Haldan Keffer Hartline, Physiology or Medicine, 1967
George Wald, Physiology or Medicine, 1967
Robert S. Mulliken, Chemistry, 1966
Charles B. Huggins, born in Canada, Physiology or Medicine, 1966
Francis Peyton Rous, Physiology or Medicine, 1966
Robert B. Woodward, Chemistry, 1965
Richard P. Feynman, Physics, 1965
Julian Schwinger, Physics, 1965
Martin Luther King Jr., Peace, 1964
Charles H. Townes, Physics, 1964
Konrad Bloch, born in then Germany, now Poland, Physiology or Medicine, 1964
Maria Goeppert-Mayer, born in then Germany, now Poland, Physics, 1963
Eugene Wigner, born in Hungary, Physics, 1963
John Steinbeck, Literature, 1962
Linus C. Pauling, Peace, 1962
James D. Watson, Physiology or Medicine, 1962
Melvin Calvin, Chemistry, 1961
Robert Hofstadter, Physics, 1961
Georg von Békésy, born in Hungary, Physiology or Medicine, 1961
Willard F. Libby, Chemistry, 1960
Donald A. Glaser, Physics, 1960
Owen Chamberlain, Physics, 1959
Emilio Segrè, born in Italy, Physics, 1959
Arthur Kornberg, Physiology or Medicine, 1959
Severo Ochoa, born in Spain, Physiology or Medicine, 1959
George Beadle, Physiology or Medicine, 1958
Joshua Lederberg, Physiology or Medicine, 1958
Edward Tatum, Physiology or Medicine, 1958
Chen Ning Yang, born in China, Physics, 1957
Tsung-Dao Lee, born in China, Physics, 1957
William B. Shockley, Physics, 1956
John Bardeen, Physics, 1956
Walter H. Brattain, born in China, Physics, 1956
Dickinson W. Richards, Physiology or Medicine, 1956
André F. Cournand, France, Physiology or Medicine, 1956
Vincent du Vigneaud, Chemistry, 1955
Willis E. Lamb, Physics, 1955
Polykarp Kusch, born in Germany, Physics, 1955
Linus C. Pauling, Chemistry, 1954
Ernest Hemingway, Literature, 1954
John F. Enders, Physiology or Medicine, 1954
Frederick C. Robbins, Physiology or Medicine, 1954
Thomas H. Weller, Physiology or Medicine, 1954
George C. Marshall, Peace, 1953
Fritz Albert Lipmann, born in then Germany, now Russia, Physiology or Medicine, 1953
E. M. Purcell, Physics, 1952
Felix Bloch, born in Switzerland, Physics, 1952
Selman A. Waksman, born in then Russian Empire, now Ukraine, Physiology or Medicine, 1952
Edwin M. McMillan, Chemistry, 1951
Glenn Theodore Seaborg, Chemistry, 1951
Ralph J. Bunche, Peace, 1950
Philip S. Hench, Physiology or Medicine, 1950
Edward C. Kendall, Physiology or Medicine, 1950
William Giauque, born in Canada, Chemistry, 1949
William Faulkner, Literature, 1949
T. S. Eliot*, Literature, 1948
American Friends Service Committee (The Quakers), Peace, 1947
Carl Ferdinand Cori, born in Austria, Physiology or Medicine, 1947
Gerty Cori, born in Austria, Physiology or Medicine, 1947
Wendell M. Stanley, Chemistry, 1946
James B. Sumner, Chemistry, 1946
John H. Northrop, Chemistry, 1946
Emily G. Balch, Peace, 1946
John R. Mott, Peace, 1946
Percy W. Bridgman, Physics, 1946
Hermann J. Muller, Physiology or Medicine, 1946
Cordell Hull, Peace, 1945
Isidor Isaac Rabi, born in Austria, Physics, 1944
Joseph Erlanger, Physiology or Medicine, 1944
Herbert S. Gasser, Physiology or Medicine, 1944
Otto Stern, born in then Germany, now Poland, Physics, 1943
Edward A. Doisy, Physiology or Medicine, 1943
Ernest Lawrence, Physics, 1939
Pearl S. Buck, Literature, 1938
Clinton Davisson, Physics, 1937
Eugene O'Neill, Literature, 1936
Carl Anderson, Physics, 1936
Harold C. Urey, Chemistry, 1934
George R. Minot, Physiology or Medicine, 1934
William P. Murphy, Physiology or Medicine, 1934
George H. Whipple, Physiology or Medicine, 1934
Thomas H. Morgan, Physiology or Medicine, 1933
Irving Langmuir, Chemistry, 1932
Jane Addams, Peace, 1931
Nicholas M. Butler, Peace, 1931
Sinclair Lewis, Literature, 1930
Frank B. Kellogg, Peace, 1929
Arthur H. Compton, Physics, 1927
Charles G. Dawes, Peace, 1925
Robert A. Millikan, Physics, 1923
Woodrow Wilson, Peace, 1919
Theodore W. Richards, Chemistry, 1914
Elihu Root, Peace, 1912
Albert A. Michelson, born in then Germany, now Poland, Physics, 1907
Theodore Roosevelt, Peace, 1906

Venezuela
Baruj Benacerraf*, Physiology or Medicine, 1980

Vietnam

Lê Đức Thọ, born in French Indochina, Peace, 1973 (declined)

Yemen
Tawakkol Karman, Peace, 2011

Yugoslavia
Ivo Andrić, Ethnic Serb and Yugoslav national born in the Condominium of Bosnia and Herzegovina, Austria-Hungary (now Bosnia and Herzegovina), Literature, 1961
Vladimir Prelog, born in the Condominium of Bosnia and Herzegovina, Austria-Hungary (now Bosnia and Herzegovina), Chemistry, 1975

See also
Nobel laureates per capita
List of Nobel laureates by university affiliation
List of Jewish Nobel laureates 
List of black Nobel laureates
List of Christian Nobel laureates
List of Muslim Nobel laureates
List of nonreligious Nobel laureates

References

 
Nobel laureates